Birchrunville Historic District is a national historic district located in West Vincent Township, Chester County, Pennsylvania. The district includes 53 contributing buildings, 5 contributing sites, and 1 contributing structure in the crossroads hamlet of Birchrunville. The district is primarily residential, with those buildings largely constructed between 1840 and 1880.  Some dwellings date to the early-19th century and are reflective of the Georgian style.  The district also includes the separately listed Birchrunville General Store.

It was added to the National Register of Historic Places in 1992.

References

Georgian architecture in Pennsylvania
Historic districts in Chester County, Pennsylvania
Historic districts on the National Register of Historic Places in Pennsylvania
National Register of Historic Places in Chester County, Pennsylvania